Catcha Group is an international Internet group founded by entrepreneur Patrick Grove. The Group controls a number of publicly listed and private media, new media, online classifieds and e-commerce businesses, and is one of the largest investors in the digital sector in emerging markets, notably ASEAN. Catcha Group and its related entities have completed over 50 investments either directly or indirectly, as sole, majority or minority shareholders.

Since inception, Catcha Group has completed a number of transactions with a total of six IPOs in fourteen years, including the 2007 listing of iProperty Group on the Australian Securities Exchange, REV Asia Berhad (previously Catcha Media Berhad) on Bursa Malaysia in 2011, and the subsequent IPOs of iCar Asia in 2012, Ensogo (previously iBuy Group) in 2013 and Frontier Digital Ventures in 2016; all three on the Australian Securities Exchange. In February 2021, the Group listed a blank check company, Catcha Investment Corp, on the NYSE. The company raised $300m in gross proceeds in their initial public offering to target technology businesses in Southeast Asia and Australia.

Portfolio 
Some of the notable companies started or invested by Catcha Group include:
 iProperty Group – owner and operator of Asia’s No.1 network of property websites, in Singapore, Malaysia, Macau, Hong Kong, Indonesia, with investments in India and the Philippines. The company was listed on the Australian Securities Exchange in September 2007, and added to the S&P/ASX 300 as one of the top 300 listed stocks on the Australian Securities Exchange in March 2014. It crossed the MYR1 billion milestone in market capitalisation in October 2013. With REA Group's US$100 million investment in July 2014, iProperty became the most highly valued publicly traded Internet company in ASEAN. In February 2016, iProperty was acquired by REA Group in a transaction valuing iProperty at US$534 million making it one of the largest acquisition of a Southeast Asian internet company in history. 
 iCar Asia Limited – ASEAN’s largest network of online automotive sites.  Among its brands are One2car.com, Autospinn.com and Thaicar.com in Thailand, Mobil123.com in Indonesia and Carlist.my, LiveLifeDrive.com and Malaysian EVO magazine and its spin offs, in Malaysia. The company was listed on the Australian Securities Exchange on 11 September 2012. In March 2013, Australia's leading online cars classifieds Carsales.com Limited acquired a seat in the company, further increasing its stake in March 2014. The S&P Dow Jones Indices announced in iCar's inclusion to the All Ordinaries Index on 21 March 2014. In September 2019, iCar acquired Indonesia's second largest automotive site, Carmudi.co.id for US$3 million.
iflix – Southeast Asian Internet TV service. The company launched in March 2015, and is now available in Malaysia, Philippines, Thailand and Indonesia. In April 2015, iflix announced the completion of a $30 million round of funding, led by Catcha Group and Philippine Long Distance Telephone Company (PLDT). In March 2016, it was announced  that iflix had attracted a $45-million investment from European pay-TV giant Sky PLC. In June 2020, Tencent acquired iflix.
Frontier Digital Ventures – operator of online classified businesses with a focus in frontier markets. Founded in May 2014 and headquartered in Kuala Lumpur, the company's primary expertise is in automotive portals, property portals and general classified websites. The company owns stakes in 15 companies operating in 20 countries across South Asia, Latin America and the Middle East and Africa. The company listed on the Australian Securities Exchange on 26 August 2016 and was included in the S&P/ASX All Technology Index in December 2020.
Rev Asia Berhad (previously Catcha Media Berhad) – Malaysia's leading digital media group that had Rev Asia Holdings, as one of its subsidiaries. The company was listed on the Malaysian Stock Exchange in July 2011, following the completion of the merger between certain Catcha Media Berhad (Catcha Media) subsidiaries and Says Sdn Bhd on 8 October 2013, a new company, Rev Asia Holdings Sdn Bhd (Rev Asia) was formed. In May 2017, Rev Asia Berhad sold off Rev Asia Holdings for US$24 million to Media Prima.
Instahome – online home rental platform targeting the Southeast Asian market. Instahome offers a seamless home rental experience for tenants, agents and landlords through its end-to-end digital platform with features including property pre-inspections, 3D virtual tours and online rental payment services. The company was co-founded in 2020 by Catcha Group co-founder and CEO Patrick Grove together with his former Chief of Staff, Eric Tan.
Boozebud – Australia’s no.1 pure play online alcohol retailer. Boozebud was founded in 2013 and sold to Carlton & United Breweries in 2016 before undergoing a management buyout in January 2021 backed by Catcha Group.
Catcha Investment Corp – A blank check company sponsored by Catcha Group and listed on the NYSE, targeting technology businesses in Southeast Asia and Australia.

Investment strategy

Focusing on investments within the online sector, Catcha Group’s investment strategy involves looking at ideas that have worked in more mature markets and looking at how they can be brought to emerging markets, particularly Southeast Asia. In an interview with e27.co, Catcha Group's Group CEO Patrick Grove has said “We like to bet on ideas where the concept is already proven. Our only risk is execution risk, we don’t like to bet on idea risk.”

Two further pillars of the Group's investment strategy include the use of mergers & acquisitions as a driver of growth and the public markets as a vehicle for this. Speaking in an interview with BRW, Patrick Grove was quoted as saying: “In an industry that moves so fast, the way to get market share fast is to acquire rather than start from scratch."

Today, Catcha Group focuses on providing growth equity and mentorship to tech entrepreneurs looking to take their companies public, leveraging the Group’s public markets and corporate transactions experience.

References

External links
 Catcha Group website
 Catcha Group YouTube
 Catcha Group Facebook page
 Catcha Group Twitter

2004 establishments in Malaysia
Mass media companies of Malaysia
Privately held companies of Malaysia
Online companies of Malaysia